The 1st constituency of French Polynesia is a French legislative constituency in French Polynesia.

Following the 2010 redistricting of French legislative constituencies, which came into application for the June 2012 legislative election, the boundaries of French Polynesia's two constituencies were redrawn so as to create a third constituency in the collectivity. Since then, the 1st constituency consists of the communes of Anaa, Arue, Arutua, Fakarava, Fangatau, Fatu-Hiva, Gambier, Hao, Hikueru, Hiva-Oa, Makemo, Manihi, Moorea-Maiao, Napuka, Nuku-Hiva, Nukutavake, Papeete, Pirae, Pukapuka, Rangiroa, Reao, Tahuata, Takaroa, Tatakoto, Tureia, Ua-Huka, and Ua-Pou.

Deputies
Alexandre Léontieff, who held the seat from 1988 to 1993, was simultaneously President of French Polynesia from 1987 to 1991.

Election results

2022

 
 
 
|-
| colspan="8" bgcolor="#E9E9E9"|
|-

2017

2014 By-election

Despite obtaining 52.96% of the vote in the first round, Maina Sage did not obtain 25% of the enrolled voters, so a second round was held.

2012

2007
Two rounds were held. These are the results of the second round, for which only the top two candidates from the first round qualified.

Source: French Ministry of the Interior.

Oscar Temaru, who contested the seat unsuccessfully, was a former and future President of French Polynesia.

2002
Only a single round was needed, as Buillard obtained an absolute majority of the vote. The results of the top two candidates are given here.

Source: French Ministry of the Interior.

References

1